Foel Gron is a peak on the Moel Eilio ridge of hills/mountains in Snowdonia, North Wales. This ridge is used as a hiker's route from Llanberis to the summit of Snowdon.

References

External links
www.geograph.co.uk : photos of Foel Gron and surrounding area

Llanberis
Mountains and hills of Gwynedd
Mountains and hills of Snowdonia
Hewitts of Wales
Nuttalls